Darienine is an anti-cholinergic alkaloid.

References

Pyridine alkaloids
Heterocyclic compounds with 3 rings
Nitrogen heterocycles
Methoxy compounds
Ketones